Somewhere on Leave is a 1943 British comedy film directed by John E. Blakeley and starring Frank Randle, Harry Korris and Dan Young. It was the third in the series of Somewhere films following Private Randle and his comrades. It was followed by Somewhere in Civvies.

Plot
Private Randle (Frank Randle) and army pals, Privates Young (Dan Young) and Enoch (Robbie Vincent) are invited by Private Desmond (Pat McGrath) to spend some off-duty time at his stately home. Private Desmond is too busy courting an ATS girl (Antoinette Lupino) to notice the squaddies are running riot in his house.

Cast

 Frank Randle - Pte. Randle
 Harry Korris - Sgt. Korris
 Dan Young - Pte. Young
 Robbie Vincent - Pte. Enoch
 Antoinette Lupino - Toni Beaumont
 Pat McGrath - Pte. Roy Desmond
 Toni Edgar-Bruce - Mrs. Delvaine
 Edna Wood - Land Girl
 Vincent Holman - Butler
 Percival Mackey Orchestra - Themselves
 Noel Dainton - Capt. Delvaine
 Sidney Monckton - Captain Adams	
 John Varley - Lieut. Bassett	
 Clifford Cobb - Commando Sgt.	
 Elizabeth Wilson - A.T.S. Girl
 Esme Lewis - Mrs Gerrard	
 Nan Hopkins - A.T.S. Girl	
 Hilda Jones - Land Girl	
 Ernie Dillon - Trampoline Artist

Critical reception
The Radio Times gave the film two out of five stars. Its critic wrote: "Of the music-hall turns who made films, Lancashire comedian Frank Randle was among the most successful. But his appeal inevitably exemplifies the North-South divide and his success - including that of his five Somewhere films - was largely confined to home ground...It may be unsophisticated, and more a series of incidents than a cohesive narrative, but it's still fun."

References

Bibliography
 Rattigan, Neil. This is England: British film and the People's War, 1939-1945. Associated University Presses, 2001.

External links

1943 films
1943 comedy films
Films directed by John E. Blakeley
British comedy films
Military humor in film
British black-and-white films
Films scored by Percival Mackey
Films shot in Greater Manchester
1940s English-language films
1940s British films